Jaroslav Pollák (11 July 1947 – 26 June 2020) was a Slovak footballer who played as a midfielder. He played for Czechoslovakia national team in 49 matches and scored one goal.

He was a participant at the 1970 FIFA World Cup, where he played in a match against England, at Euro 1976, where his team won the gold medal, and also at Euro 1980.

Pollák played for more than 10 years for FC VSS Košice.

Death
Pollák died on 26 June 2020 at the age of 72.

Honours
Czechoslovakia
UEFA European Championship: 1976

Individual
UEFA European Championship Team of the Tournament: 1976

References 

 

1947 births
Slovak footballers
Czechoslovak footballers
FC VSS Košice players
AC Sparta Prague players
1970 FIFA World Cup players
UEFA Euro 1976 players
UEFA Euro 1980 players
UEFA European Championship-winning players
Czechoslovakia international footballers
2020 deaths
Czechoslovak expatriate footballers
Expatriate footballers in Austria
Czechoslovak expatriate sportspeople in Austria
Association football midfielders
People from Košice-okolie District
Sportspeople from the Košice Region
FC Red Bull Salzburg players
FK Dukla Banská Bystrica players